Monique Marie Henderson  (born February 18, 1983 in San Diego, California) is an American track and field athlete, who specializes in the 400-meter dash. Henderson was a gold medalist in both the 2004 Olympic Games in Athens, Greece and the 2008 Olympic Games in Beijing, China  as a member of the American 4×400-meter relay squad.

As a young runner, she set the still standing American record for 9-10-year-old girls in the 400 meters.

Henderson prepped at Morse High School in San Diego '01. She is the only four-time 400 meters California State Champion in the state's history from 98–01. At age 17, she set a US junior class, as well as high school national record (since broken), at 50.74 in the 400 m at the CIF California State Meet. In 2000, still in high school, she was named to the US Olympic track and field team. Selected as an alternate (Pool) for the 4 × 400 m squad but did not run. That year she was named the national Girl's "High School Athlete of the Year" by Track and Field News.

After graduating from high school in 2001 she accepted a scholarship to attend UCLA. While at UCLA she went on to be a five-time Pac-10 champion. In 2004, she placed second at the NCAA championships at 400 m. The next year she became the 2005 NCAA outdoor champion at 400 m, establishing a new NCAA record (50.10) that still stands. In 2005, she won the Honda Award as the nation's best female collegiate track and field athlete.

Since 2010, the gold medal at the Athens Olympics in 2004 has been in doubt as Crystal Cox, who ran for the team in a preliminary round, admitted to doping. However, as of 2012 the original result still stands.

She holds a master's degree in kinesiology and worked as a professor in the exercise science department at San Diego Mesa College until 2015 when she became the head coach at Golden West College in Summer 2015.

Honors
Monique Henderson was nominated and inducted into the San Diego County Women's Hall of Fame in 2009 hosted by Women's Museum of California, Commission on the Status of Women, University of California, San Diego Women's Center, and San Diego State University Women's Studies.

References

External links
 
 
 
 
 
 

1983 births
Living people
American female sprinters
Olympic gold medalists for the United States in track and field
Athletes (track and field) at the 2004 Summer Olympics
Athletes (track and field) at the 2008 Summer Olympics
Medalists at the 2004 Summer Olympics
Medalists at the 2008 Summer Olympics
African-American female track and field athletes
Track and field athletes from San Diego
UCLA Bruins women's track and field athletes
Olympic female sprinters
21st-century African-American sportspeople
21st-century African-American women
20th-century African-American people
20th-century African-American women